The Jubilee Medal "60 Years of Victory in the Great Patriotic War 1941–1945" (Russian: Юбилейная медаль «60 лет Победы в Великой Отечественной войне 1941–1945 гг.») is a state commemorative medal of the Russian Federation created to denote the 60th anniversary of the 1945 victory over Nazi Germany.  It was established on February 28, 2004 by Presidential Decree № 277.

Medal statute 
The Jubilee Medal "60 Years of Victory in the Great Patriotic War 1941–1945" is awarded to veterans of the Armed Forces of the USSR who participated in the fighting in the Great Patriotic War, guerrillas, the Underground, those awarded the Medal "For the Victory over Germany in the Great Patriotic War 1941–1945" or "For the Victory over Japan",  persons awarded for their selfless work the medal Medal "For Valiant Labour in the Great Patriotic War 1941-1945" or "Citizen of the siege of Leningrad" or any of the "Defence" medals of the cities or regions of the USSR; to persons who worked in the period from 22 June 1941 to May 9, 1945 for no less than six months, excluding the period of work in the temporarily occupied territories; former under-age prisoners of concentration camps, ghettos and other places of detention established by the Nazis and their allies; foreign nationals from outside the Commonwealth of Independent States who fought in the national military forces in the USSR, as part of guerilla units, underground groups, and other anti-fascist groups who have made significant contribution to victory in the Great Patriotic War and who were awarded state awards of the USSR or Russian Federation.

Presidential Decree 1099 of September 7, 2010 removed the Jubilee Medal "60 Years of Victory in the Great Patriotic War 1941–1945" from the list of state awards of the Russian Federation. It is no longer awarded.

Medal description 
The Jubilee Medal "60 Years of Victory in the Great Patriotic War 1941–1945" is a 32mm in diameter tombac circular medal.  Its obverse bears the relief image of the Order of Victory, at the bottom, the relief numbers "1945–2005".  The reverse bears the inscription in seven lines "60 Years of Victory in the Great Patriotic War of 1941–1945" within a laurel wreath.

The medal is suspended by a ring through the award's suspension loop to a standard Russian pentagonal mount covered with an overlapping 24mm wide red silk moiré ribbon with 5mm edge Ribbons of Saint George.

Recipients 

The individuals below were recipients of the Jubilee Medal "60 Years of Victory in the Great Patriotic War 1941–1945".

Russian Federation
 Cellist and conductor Mstislav Leopoldovich Rostropovich
 Marshal of the Soviet Union Sergei Leonidovich Sokolov
 Marshal of the Soviet Union Vasily Ivanovich Petrov
 Artillery officer Colonel Ivan Fedorovich Ladyga
 Hero of the Soviet Union Lieutenant General Galaktion Yeliseyevich Alpaidze
 Hero of the Soviet Union Kazakh Army General Sagadat Nurmagambetov

Foreign nationals

 King Michael I of Romania
 President of Greece Karolos Papoulias
 Polish General and former President Wojciech Jaruzelski
 Former American President George H. W. Bush
 Former Albanian President Alfred Moisiu
 Former Croatian President Stjepan Mesić

See also 

Awards and decorations of the Russian Federation
Awards and decorations of the Soviet Union

References

External links
 The Commission on State Awards to the President of the Russian Federation
 The Russian Gazette  In Russian

Civil awards and decorations of Russia
Russian awards
Military awards and decorations of Russia
Awards established in 2004